Corymorphidae is a family of hydroid cnidarians. For long placed in a presumed superfamily or infraorder Tubulariida of suborder Capitata, they are actually close relatives of the Hydridae and are now united with these and a number of relatives in a newly recognized suborder Aplanulata. Most, if not all species in this family grow on stalks and resemble small flowers.

According to the World Register of Marine Species, the following genera are contained in this family:
Branchiocerianthus Mark, 1898
Corymorpha M. Sars, 1835
Euphysa Forbes, 1848
Euphysilla Kramp, 1955
Gymnogonos Bonnevie, 1898
Hataia Hirai & Yamada, 1965
Octovannuccia Xu, Huang & Lin, 2010
Paraeuphysilla Xu, Huang & Go, 2011
Paragotoea Kramp, 1942
Pinushydra Bouillon & Grohmann, 1990
Siphonohydra Salvini-Plawen, 1966

References

 
Aplanulata
Cnidarian families